Roseville is the most populous city in Placer County, California, located within the Sacramento metropolitan area. As of 2019, the US Census Bureau estimated the city's population to be 141,500. Interstate 80 runs through Roseville and State Route 65 runs through part of the northern edge of the city.

History
The settlement was originally a stage coach station called Griders. According to the Roseville Historical Society, in 1864 the Central Pacific Railroad tracks were constructed northeastward from Sacramento. The point where the tracks met the California Central Railroad line was named "Junction". Junction eventually became known as Roseville. In 1909, three years after the Southern Pacific Railroad moved its facilities from Rocklin to Roseville, the town became an incorporated city. What followed was a period of expansion, with the community building more than 100 structures, including what was the largest ice manufacturing plant in the world (Pacific Fruit Express building, in 1913).

The city was a railroad town for decades, with the railroad employing up to 1,225 people by 1929, out of a population of only 6,425 people. With the onset of World War II, the rail yards became busier than ever and the post-war building boom brought continued prosperity. However, the nature of the city changed dramatically in the 1950s.

During the 1950s the railroad continued to expand and upgrade, converting its steam engine fleet to all diesel engines by the end of the decade. However, the railroads began falling in the shadow of air travel and the development of the national Interstate Highway System. Thus, although the railroad remained (and still remains) a major employer, the expansion of the city began branching out into other employment sectors. Another important change during this period was the Washington Boulevard (then called Seawell) railroad underpass construction in 1950. While this improved the ability of people to travel from one side of the tracks to the other, it meant that people were no longer traveling through the Roseville business district north of the tracks. The completion of Interstate 80 in 1956 shifted the population from downtown to what would become known as East Roseville. The old downtown area slid into a gradual decline.

The Roseville Yard of the Southern Pacific (now Union Pacific) was the site of a 1973 Roseville Yard Disaster which involved a major explosion and fire.

The city saw steady population growth throughout the ensuing decades, as shopping centers, major retailers, and homes were constructed throughout the city. The growth rate was modest until 1985. Between 1929 when the population was 6,425 people and 1985, the population grew by only 22,563 people. In 1985 the population stood at 28,988 people. Five years later it was 44,685 people, and by 2000 it was 74,234 people. Some of this growth was fueled by the location of major employers, such as Hewlett Packard (in 1979) and NEC (in 1983). The population as of 2014 was 126,956 people.

Revitalization
Projects included the Vernon Streetscape Project, Atlantic Street Beautification, Civic Plaza Complex, Downtown Vernon Street and Historic Old Town, Historic Old Town Streetscape project, Riverside Avenue Streetscape project, Oak Street Improvement Project, and Washington Boulevard pedestrian underpass. A new parking garage opened in 2007, the Roseville Arts! Blueline Gallery opened in 2008, a new Civic Center opened in 2013, and the Vernon Street Town Square now features a small raised stage, a water spray for children, and a venue for community events.

In 1995, a Roseville police officer shot and killed another officer, Mark A. White, during a shooting attack at the city's police station. White (in plain clothes) drew his weapon against the assailant, but another officer mistakenly believed White was also an assailant and shot and killed him.

On October 21, 2010, a young man set fires inside the Westfield Galleria at Roseville resulting in major damage.

Geography

Several streams flow through Roseville, including Dry Creek, Linda Creek, Secret Ravine and Cirby Creek.

Climate
Roseville has a hot-summer Mediterranean climate that is characterized by cool, wet, usually snowless winters and hot, dry summers (Köppen Csa). The wet season is generally October through April. Because Roseville is east of Sacramento and at a higher elevation, it receives slightly more rainfall.

On March 26, 2014, an EF0 tornado touched down in Roseville.

Demographics

2010
The 2010 United States Census reported that Roseville had a population of 118,788. The racial makeup of Roseville was 94,199 (79.3%) White, 2,329 (2.0%) African American, 885 (0.7%) Native American, 10,026 (8.4%) Asian (3.1% Filipino, 2.0% Indian, 1.0% Chinese, 0.6% Japanese, 0.6% Vietnamese, 0.5% Korean, 0.8% Other), 346 (0.3%) Pacific Islander, 5,087 (4.3%) from other races, and 5,916 (5.0%) from two or more races. There were 17,359 people of Hispanic or Latino ancestry, of any race (14.6%).

The Census reported that 117,941 people (99.3% of the population) lived in households, 478 (0.4%) lived in non-institutionalized group quarters, and 369 (0.3%) were institutionalized.

There were 45,059 households, out of which 16,885 (37.5%) had children under the age of 18 living in them, 24,050 (53.4%) were opposite-sex married couples living together, 4,901 (10.9%) had a female householder with no husband present, 2,088 (4.6%) had a male householder with no wife present. There were 2,518 (5.6%) unmarried opposite-sex partnerships, and 286 (0.6%) same-sex married couples or partnerships. 11,042 households (24.5%) were made up of individuals, and 4,502 (10.0%) had someone living alone who was 65 years of age or older. The average household size was 2.62. There were 31,039 families (68.9% of all households); the average family size was 3.14.

The age distribution of the population shows 31,210 people (26.3%) under the age of 18, 9,397 people (7.9%) aged 18 to 24, 33,362 people (28.1%) aged 25 to 44, 28,952 people (24.4%) aged 45 to 64, and 15,867 people (13.4%) who were 65 years of age or older. The median age was 36.8 years. For every 100 females, there were 91.9 males. For every 100 females age 18 and over, there were 88.4 males.

The homeowner vacancy rate was 2.3%; the rental vacancy rate was 6.8%. 79,887 people (67.3% of the population) lived in owner-occupied housing units and 38,054 people (32.0%) lived in rental housing units.

2005
As of 2005, there were 103,845 people, 42,538 households, and 21,855 families residing in the city. The racial makeup of the city in 2010 was 71.0% non-Hispanic White, 1.8% non-Hispanic African American, 0.5% Native American, 8.2% Asian, 0.2% Pacific Islander, 0.2% from other races, and 3.4% from two or more races. Hispanic or Latino of any race were 14.6% of the population.

There were 30,783 households, out of which 35.4% had children under the age of 18 living with them, 57.1% were married couples living together, 10.1% had a female householder with no husband present, and 29.0% were non-families. 23.1% of all households were made up of individuals, and 9.2% had someone living alone who was 65 years of age or older. The average household size was 2.57 and the average family size was 3.03.

In the city, the age distribution of the population shows 26.8% under the age of 18, 7.0% from 18 to 24, 30.8% from 25 to 44, 21.0% from 45 to 64, and 14.5% who were 65 years of age or older. The median age was 36 years. For every 100 females, there were 92.1 males. For every 100 females age 18 and over, there were 88.8 males.

According to a 2007 estimate, the median income for a household in the city was $68,273, and the median income for a family was $84,863 Males had a median income of $50,426 versus $35,494 for females. The per capita income for the city was $47,021. About 3.4% of families and 4.9% of the population were below the poverty line, including 5.3% of those under age 18 and 4.1% of those age 65 or over.

Economy
The city of Roseville has a variety of businesses. It has encouraged the addition of large retail centers, including one of the largest auto malls in the country, which contributes significantly to sales tax receipts at the city and county level. Revenue from sales tax has been a main reason why the city of Roseville has been able to keep up the city's infrastructure as the population has dramatically increased. This environment has produced a mix of housing, small and large employers, as well as shopping opportunities. A popular water park, Roseville Golfland SunSplash, is also located in Roseville.
Companies based in the city include financial technology unicorn GoodLeap.

Shopping
Shopping plays a vital role in the economy of Roseville, which has the thirteenth highest retail sales of all California cities. Roseville is considered a regional shopping destination, with the Westfield Galleria at Roseville being the main shopping center in the city and the second-largest shopping mall in Northern California. Westfield embarked on a  expansion project costing $270 million, because of the revenue they acquire from this high-end mall.

Across the street from the Galleria, Peter Bollinger Investment Company built a $70 million complex named "Fountains at Roseville". Fountains at Roseville is a  retail center that includes recreation centers. The first phase opened to the public on June 30, 2008, and includes retailers Whole Foods Market, White House Black Market, and Sunglass Hut, as well as a vast variety of casual and fine dining options. Plans call for future construction of hotel, additional retail, and office buildings as well.

In addition to the Galleria and Fountains at Roseville, the city has many shopping plazas surrounding the Galleria and the Douglas Boulevard financial corridor.

Major employers
The top ten employers of the city as of 2017 are:

Education

Public schools
Roseville is part of the Roseville City School District, Eureka Union School District, Dry Creek Joint Elementary School District, and Roseville Joint Union High School District.

Colleges and universities
Extension campuses of Brandman University and Sierra College (called "Roseville Center") are located in Roseville.

Media
Rocklin and Roseville Today is a daily online newspaper. The Roseville Press-Tribune is a local weekly newspaper. Roseville High School's student-run news organization, Eye of the Tiger, publishes the bimonthly Eye of the Tiger newspaper and produces the biweekly Eye of the Tiger News broadcast. The Sacramento Bee is also distributed in Roseville. Style Magazine, founded in 2003, is the area's largest circulation general interest, monthly magazine.

Infrastructure

Transportation
Two highways run through the city: Interstate 80 and State Route 65 (the southern terminus of which connects to I-80).

Amtrak, the national passenger rail system, provides service to Roseville at the Roseville Amtrak Station and is part of the Capitol Corridor.

Roseville Transit is a public transit service overseen by the city of Roseville and operated by MV Transportation. The system provides a total of 12 regular local routes, as well as the Roseville Transit Dial-A-Ride (DAR) and Roseville Transit Commuter service. There are several stops where connections may be made with the Sacramento Regional Transit line and Placer County Transit.

Placer County Transit connects Roseville with the Watt/I-80 RT light rail station, as well as the cities of Auburn, Lincoln, Rocklin, and other cities along the Interstate 80 corridor. The Placer Commuter Express service to Sacramento also serves the Taylor Rd. park and ride lot.

Utilities
The City of Roseville provides electric, water, wastewater, and solid waste services to most areas. In February 2020, 75 project customers, including Roseville, received permanent federal water contracts for the Central Valley Project.

Pacific Gas and Electric provides natural gas service. Internet, cable, and/or telephone companies that service the Roseville area include AT&T, Comcast, and Consolidated Communications.

Healthcare
Major healthcare providers in the city include Sutter Roseville and Kaiser Permanente. There are multiple smaller clinics located near or around the city. UC Davis Medical Center is also located in nearby Sacramento.

Fire department
The Roseville Fire Department provides fire protection and emergency medical services. The department is responsible for an area of  housing a population of 118,788 .

The department has 8 stations with a single battalion.

Notable people

Residents
 George Barris, auto customizer, created TV's Batmobile
 Isaiah Frey, NFL football player for the Chicago Bears
 Jason Hill, NFL football player
 Bizz Johnson, U.S. Representative and mayor of Roseville
 Dan Quinn, mixed martial arts fighter and stevia advocate
 David Yost, actor
 Neilson Powless, professional cyclist
 Kolton Miller, NFL football player for the Las Vegas Raiders 
 Jordan Kunaszyk, NFL football player for the Carolina Panthers
Steven Anderson, Baptist preacher

Natives
Evelyn Ashford, runner, Olympic gold medalist and world record holder
Cameron Beaubier, motorcycle racer, five-time MotoAmerica Superbike champion
Tedy Bruschi, NFL football player
Dan Bunz, NFL football player
Connie Champagne, singer and actress
Ray Clemons, NFL football player
John Ensign, U.S. Senator from Nevada
Leanne Hulsenberg, professional bowler and member of the USBC and PWBA Halls of Fame
Heather Lynn Johnsen, first female tomb guard for the Tomb of the Unknown Soldier (Arlington) 
Thomas King, American-Canadian writer and broadcast presenter
Andrew Knapp, catcher for the Philadelphia Phillies
Cassie McFarland, designer of Baseball Hall of Fame Commemorative Coin
Scott Pruett, 2008 Rolex sports car series championship winner
Molly Ringwald (1968-), Brat Pack actress 
Summer Sanders, Olympic swimmer, gold medalist, actress, TV personality
Dominic Sandoval, dancer, member of dance group Quest Crew
Andrew Susac, MLB baseball player
Chelsea Wolfe, Heavy metal singer/songwriter

See also
Louis Rose
Rose Creek
Placer County, California
Dry Creek (American River)
Secret Ravine

References

External links

 
Cities in Placer County, California
Cities in Sacramento metropolitan area
Geography of the Sacramento Valley
Incorporated cities and towns in California
Populated places established in 1909
1909 establishments in California